Ernesto Federico Alterio Bacaicoa (born 25 September 1970) is an Argentine-Spanish film, theatre, and television actor.

Early life
Alterio is the son of psychologist Modesta Ángela Bacaicoa Destéfano and actor Héctor Alterio Onorato. His younger sister Malena is also dedicated to acting. He is of Italian descent, his grandparents were originally from Carpinone, a commune in the province of Isernia, in the Molise region. After the coup in Argentina that took place very shortly after the birth of Malena, his father Héctor Alterio was threatened by Triple A, so the family went into exile and settled in Spain between 1974 and 1975 (where he was working at the time), years later he obtained Spanish nationality.

Installed with his family in Madrid, when he was four years old, Ernesto suffered the uprooting that exile brings. He remained attached to his Argentine roots through family traditions. He began Biology studies but left to take up History, and continued with those studies for two years. Encouraged to be like his father, Ernesto said that he went "sideways, skirting the edge of the pond so as not to fall into it: music, photography, history..." until he made the decision to accept being an actor.

Career 
In 1996, he founded the theatre group 'Ración de oreja' (seed of 'Animalario') together with Alberto San Juan, Guillermo Toledo, and Nathalie Poza.

He has starred in the cult miniseries Vientos del agua along with his father, and has twice worked with director Marcelo Piñeyro, who frequently hires his father in roles. He works both in Spanish and Argentine television.

Selected filmography

Film

Television

References

External links
 

Argentine emigrants to Spain
Spanish male film actors
Spanish male television actors
1970 births
Living people
Male actors from Buenos Aires
Argentine people of Italian descent
20th-century Spanish male actors
21st-century Spanish male actors